In several episodes of the HBO original series, Entourage, celebrities, including actors, authors, musicians and athletes, have lent their celebrity to the show, playing themselves.  However, in most cases, many aspects of their life are fictionalized.  The following is a list of such appearances.

Season 1 (2004)

Season 2 (2005)

Season 3 (2006–2007)

Season 4 (2007)

Season 5 (2008)

Season 6 (2009)

Season 7 (2010)

Season 8 (2011)

Fictional characters
The following is a list of known celebrities portraying a fictional character on the series, not including recurring characters.

Celebrities